Tabil Ahammed is a Tunisian spice mixture generally consisting of ground coriander seed, caraway seed, garlic powder, and chili powder. Other ingredients may also be included, such as rose flower powder, cumin, mint, laurel, cloves or turmeric. The term can also refer to coriander by itself.

See also
 List of Middle Eastern dishes
 List of African dishes

References

Arab cuisine
Algerian cuisine
Tunisian cuisine
Middle Eastern cuisine